The Haverford School is a private, non-sectarian, all-boys college preparatory day school, junior kindergarten through grade twelve. Founded in 1884 as The Haverford College Grammar School, it is located in Haverford, Pennsylvania.

History 
The school was founded in 1884 at the request of Alexander and Lois Cassatt, niece of President James Buchanan, as The Haverford College Grammar School. Affiliated initially with neighboring Haverford College until 1903, the school became independent, changed its name to The Haverford School, and moved to its current location across Railroad Avenue from the college. The school was Quaker during its affiliation with the college but is now non-sectarian.

Haverford's original school colors were red and yellow for the first decade of the school's existence. However, after the outbreak of the Spanish–American War in 1898, the official colors were changed to maroon and gold out of national pride since the colors of the Spanish flag were the same red and yellow.

Curriculum 
All Upper School students must take four years of English, three years of history, mathematics, and science, and two consecutive years of foreign language and fine arts. Many students elect to take four years of history, foreign language, and fine arts. 

Dozens of electives are offered in the humanities and sciences. Among the humanities, some well-liked electives are European Dictators, Modern Black Lives: 1964- Present, Latin Poetry & Prose, and Music Production & Recording. Common science electives are Advanced Topics in Chemistry, Macro- and Micro-economics, Environmental Science, and Theoretical Physics. Summer study programs are in place with laboratories at the University of Pennsylvania and its hospital system.

Furthermore, Upper School students are required to gain two sports credits a year, which can be earned through participation on an inter-scholastic athletics team or extracurricular activities, such as mock trial or jazz band. Additionally, this requirement can be satisfied by any role in one school theatrical production.

Among recent graduates, popular colleges include the University of Pennsylvania, Villanova University, Boston College, and Harvard University.

Athletics 

The Haverford School is a member of the Inter-Academic League, the country's oldest inter-scholastic athletic conference.

With eighteen interscholastic sports, Haverford ranks among the top 20% of private high schools in Pennsylvania for amount of sports offered.

The Haverford School lacrosse team gained national fame when the Fords won national championships in 2011 and 2015 after undefeated seasons. The 2015 team won USA Today's All-USA Boys' Lacrosse Team honors. The Fords lacrosse team is the most awarded team in the Inter-Ac League, having won two national championships, ten state championships, and eighteen Inter-Ac titles.

The Haverford School squash team won the U.S. high school national championship in 2017.

In 2018–19, Haverford captured the Inter-Ac's Heyward Cup for overall excellence in athletic competition. The Fords have won the Heyward Cup 18 times, more than any other school in the league.

EA Day
Haverford is known for its long-running rivalry with fellow Inter-Academic League member Episcopal Academy. The two schools have competed annually since 1889 on Haverford-EA Day, a day of competition occurring each November. The winner is determined by who wins more of the day's five events: cross-country, water polo, soccer, golf, and football. In the event of a tie, victory goes to the incumbent champion. Each year's winner earns the "Sweater". The Sweater is made from parts of uniform sweaters from each school, cut in half and sewn down the middle. Each school has a side, indicated by its colors, onto which years of victory are embroidered. Since the inception of the Sweater in 1987, Haverford has led Episcopal Academy with 18 Haverford/EA Day wins. Haverford held the Sweater for a decade between 2006 and 2016, the longest streak between either school.

#10ve Cup

A newer, friendly rivalry exists between Haverford and Garnet Valley High School's lacrosse teams. When Kip Taviano, a Concord Township-native and Haverford School lacrosse and football player, was killed in a 2013 car accident, the two schools came together to establish the #10ve Foundation in his memory. Haverford School and Garnet Valley compete in the #10ve Cup, an annual lacrosse event to benefit the Kip Taviano '13 Scholarship Fund.

Campus 
All of the Haverford School's academic buildings and athletic fields are located at its original 30-acre campus. There are five significant buildings: the Upper School, Middle School, Lower School, Field House, and Dining Hall. In addition, there is a small building home to the school store and cafe. 

The athletic facilities include a 25-meter, eight-lane pool with two dive wells, four international-size squash courts, three regulation-sized basketball courts, a three-mat wrestling room with panoramic windows, an athletic training center, and an advanced fitness center. Outdoor facilities include three turf fields, one grass field, a four-lane track, an outdoor basketball court, and four tennis courts. The school also owns a boathouse in nearby Conshohocken. Before its 2015 construction, the crew team had rowed out of the Undine Barge Club since 1938.

In early 2022, the school acquired a 44-acre parcel of land approximately three miles from campus.

Sister schools
Haverford's sister schools are the Baldwin School in nearby Bryn Mawr and the Agnes Irwin School. The three schools hold several academic and community service events across the Philadelphia region.

Notable alumni

Heads of school

References

External links
 A History of the Haverford School by Headmaster Joseph Cox
 "Building Better Men", Huffington Post blog (by Upper School Head Matt Green); accessed July 29, 2015.

Boys' schools in the United States
Preparatory schools in Pennsylvania
Private elementary schools in Pennsylvania
Private middle schools in Pennsylvania
Private high schools in Pennsylvania
Educational institutions established in 1884
Haverford Township, Pennsylvania
Frank Furness buildings
Schools in Delaware County, Pennsylvania
1884 establishments in Pennsylvania